East Asian blepharoplasty, also known as "double eyelid surgery", is a type of cosmetic surgery where the skin around the eye is reshaped (blepharoplasty). The purpose of the procedure is to create an upper eyelid with a crease (i.e. "double eyelid") from an eyelid that is naturally without a crease (also known as a "single eyelid" or "monolid").

Anatomically, there are a number of subtle differences in the upper eyelids of East Asians, compared with the eyelids of Europeans and Sub-Saharan Africans. While some East Asians have a double eyelid and some do not, there is also a large variation in the crease position (double eyelid size) of the East Asian upper eyelid. Several methods can be used to create the double eyelid—including the full-incisional, partial incision and no incision methods (e.g. the DST method). Each has its advantages depending on the patient's anatomy and desires.

East Asian blepharoplasty have been reported to be the most common aesthetic procedure in Taiwan, South Korea and other parts of East Asia and is also frequently performed in Northeast Indian states such as Assam. The procedure has been reported to have some risk of complications, but is generally quite safe if done by an expert plastic surgeon. Practitioners of East Asian blepharoplasty include plastic surgeons (facial plastic and reconstructive surgeons), otolaryngologists, oral and maxillofacial surgeons, and ophthalmologists (oculoplastic surgeons). A procedure to remove the epicanthal fold (i.e., an epicanthoplasty) is often performed in conjunction with an East Asian blepharoplasty.

See also
 Epicanthoplasty
 Blepharoplasty
 Cosmetic surgery

References

Health in East Asia
Oculoplastic surgery
Stereotypes of East Asian people